Ban Bueng is a town (thesaban mueang) in the Ban Bueng district (amphoe) of Chonburi province in eastern Thailand. In 2014, it had a population of 19,346.

References

Populated places in Chonburi province